Serine/threonine-protein kinase TAO3 is an enzyme that in humans is encoded by the TAOK3 gene.

References

Further reading